Phyllopidea is a genus of plant bugs in the family Miridae. There are at least four described species in Phyllopidea.

Species
These four species belong to the genus Phyllopidea:
 Phyllopidea hirta (Van Duzee, 1916)
 Phyllopidea montana Knight, 1968
 Phyllopidea picta (Uhler, 1893)
 Phyllopidea utahensis Knight, 1968

References

Further reading

 
 
 

Phylini
Articles created by Qbugbot